Ruhrbach  is a river of Hesse, Germany. It flows into the Warme in Niedermeiser.

See also

List of rivers of Hesse

Rivers of Hesse
Rivers of Germany